Ben Hull (born 8 November 1972) is an English actor and presenter.

Career
Hull's first appearance was in 1994 when he appeared in the ITV drama, Revelations. 
He then went on to appear as Martin Wells in Children's ITV series Children's Ward.  
In 1995 he got his big break playing Lewis Richardson in the Channel 4 soap Hollyoaks, a role which he also played in a couple of the soap's spin-off TV series Hollyoaks: Movin' On and Hollyoaks: Breaking Boundaries; he left this role in 2001.  

In 2002 he starred in another of Channel 4's soaps, the now defunct Brookside, playing Dr Gary Parr, but this was not Hull's first appearance in the soap, as a few years before he played a character called Syd Watts in one of the soap's spin-off videos, Brookside: Double Take. In 2003 he joined the BBC One medical drama Casualty for 3 episodes, playing Dale Charters.  
Hull returned to soap operas when, in 2005, he joined Five's (now Channel 5) now defunct Family Affairs, playing Adam Green, and in 2006 he starred in BBC One's daytime soap Doctors, playing John Myson.  
In 2007 it was announced that Hull would be starring in all 50 episodes of new ITV1 TV series The Royal Today, which is a modern day spin-off from ITV1's 1960s TV series The Royal, playing Charge nurse Adam Fernley. The series was aired in 2008. 
Hull has appeared in BBC One drama series Missing.

In 2012, Hull appeared in new ITV crime drama Crime Stories, playing series regular Detective Ben Shaw. The show concentrates on police procedure and blends documentary camera technique with CCTV images. 2012 also saw Hull play Consultant Obstetrician Derwood Thompson in the BBC's medical drama Holby City. He reprised the role in 2013 and 2018. In March 2023, Hull appeared as buyer Owen Longford in Coronation Street.

Hull has also appeared in many theatre productions including Four Knights in Knaresborough and Cat on a Hot Tin Roof, both of which he was nominated for a Best Actor award in the Manchester Evening News Theatre Awards.
In 2008 Hull starred as Garry Lejeune in a UK touring production of Noises Off.

Hull's work as a presenter includes Film24, Bid, Angela and Friends, Gala TV, the competitions for This Morning and for Travel Channel (UK). He also presents the Army Recruiting Channel's "Ask the Army".

Present
In 2022, Hull appeared as Jack in the third series of Ricky Gervais' After Life.

Personal life
Hull is married to actress and former Family Affairs co-star Anna Acton.

Filmography

References

External links

1972 births
English male soap opera actors
Living people